Luxembourgish Americans  are Americans of Luxembourgish ancestry. According to the United States' 2000 Census, there were 45,139 Americans of full or partial Luxembourgish descent. In 1940 the number of Americans with Luxembourger ancestry was around 100,000.

The first families from Luxembourg arrived in the United States, around 1842, fleeing of the overpopulation and economic change in the newly independent country. They worked in the field, as was traditional in their country.

Luxembourgish Americans are overwhelmingly concentrated in the Midwest, where most originally settled in the nineteenth century.  At the 2000 Census, the states with the largest self-reported Luxembourgian American populations were Illinois (6,963), Wisconsin (6,580), Minnesota (5,867), Iowa (5,624), and California (2,824).

History

Between the mid-19th century and the early 20th century, approximately one-third of the Luxembourgish population emigrated. Luxembourg was, at the time, a poor country with an economy dominated by agriculture. The United States was a popular destination for Luxembourgers, as it was for many other European emigrants of the period. The number of Luxembourgers who emigrated to the US in the 19th century is thought to be around 60,000–70,000.

Substantial Luxembourger emigration to America took off from about 1845, for several reasons. Advances in medicine caused the rate of infant mortality to decline. This resulted in overpopulation. The lack of work in industry led many to despair. The country could no longer feed its population. In the large families of the time, the dividing up of inheritances led to fragmentation of land ownership. The portion of each child was reduced to a few hectares, which was barely enough to feed a family. Selling one's portion to the elder brother, however, provided enough money for the other siblings to pay for the voyage to America and to start a new life there.

Travelling was becoming easier in this period as well. Previously, it had taken as long to go from Luxembourg to Paris as from there to America. After a while, the news came to Europe that there was much unused land available in America. The Homestead Act offered fertile land for low prices. Many therefore took the step of attempting a new start, since staying in one's home country would mean death by starvation.

Luxembourgers arriving in the United States would not necessarily be registered as such by the authorities, but instead as Belgians or Germans. After arriving in New York, Luxembourgers tended to move on to Chicago, as well as Iowa, Minnesota, and Wisconsin. A small number stayed in New York.

In 1871, just after the Great Chicago Fire parishioners of St. Michael's Church in Chicago formed the first Luxembourgish-American organization in the United States, the Luxemburger Unterstuetzungs Verien (Luxembourg Mutual Aid Society). Other organizations followed including the Luxembourg Bruderbund and the Luxembourg American Cultural Society.

Notable people

 John W. Beschter (1763–1842), Jesuit missionary and briefly president of Georgetown College
 Chris Evert (born 1954), tennis player and winner of 21 Grand Slam titles
 Red Faber (1888–1976), baseball player and Baseball Hall of Fame inductee
 Hugo Gernsback (1884–1967), inventor and science fiction writer
 Dennis Hastert (born 1942), Republican politician and former Speaker of the United States House of Representatives
 Theodore Hesburgh (1917–2015), priest and academic leader
 Paul O. Husting (1866–1917), Democratic politician and former United States Senator for Wisconsin
 Vincent Kartheiser (born 1979), actor known for playing Connor in Angel and Pete Campbell in Mad Men
 Richard F. Kneip (1933–1987), Democratic politician and former Governor of South Dakota
 Paul Lauterbur (1929–2007), chemist and winner of the Nobel Prize in Physiology or Medicine
 John L. May (1922–1994), clergyman of the Roman Catholic Church; served as Bishop of Mobile and Archbishop of St. Louis
 Arno Mayer (born 1926), historian and professor at Princeton University
 Nicholas Muller (1836–1917), Democratic politician and former United States Representative from New York
 Gene Scholz (1917–2005), professional basketball player
 Edward Steichen (1879–1973), photographer, painter, art gallery and museum curator
 Matthew Woll (1880–1956), trade unionist and former Vice President of the AFL-CIO
 Loretta Young (1913–2000), actress and Best Actress Academy Award winner
 Alex Wagner (born 1977), journalist and author

See also

Luxembourg Brotherhood of America
Luxembourgers
Luxembourgian Brazilians
Luxembourg–United States relations

References

External links

 Luxembourgish in the United States
 English Language contact in the Luxembourgish linguistic enclaves in the Midwest of the USA  
 Amira Ouardalitou researches the Luxembourgish language in the New World
 loc.gov/rr/european/imlu/luxem.html
 Luxemburgisch in den USA: eine empirische Untersuchung- Amira-Louise Ouardalitou
 US Luxemburgisch in den USA
 Letzebuergesch an Amerika vum Henri Fischbach
 Englischer Sprachkontakt in den luxemburgischen Sprachinseln im Mittleren Westen der USA - Master thesis Amira Ouardalitou

 
European-American society
 
United States